Haing Somnang Ngor (Khmer: ហាំង សំណាង ង៉ោ; ; March 22, 1940 – February 25, 1996) was a Cambodian American gynecologist, obstetrician, actor and author. He is best remembered for winning the Academy Award for Best Supporting Actor in 1985 for his debut performance in the film The Killing Fields (1984), in which he portrayed Cambodian journalist and refugee Dith Pran. 

Ngor is one of two actors of Asian descent to win an Academy Award for Best Supporting Actor, the other being Ke Huy Quan in 2023. He survived three terms in Cambodian prison camps, using his medical knowledge to keep himself alive by eating beetles, termites, and scorpions; he eventually crawled between Khmer Rouge and Vietnamese lines to safety in a Red Cross refugee camp. His mother was Khmer and his father was of Hakka Chinese descent. Ngor and Harold Russell are the only two non-professional actors to win an Academy Award in an acting category.

Ngor continued acting for the rest of his life, most notably in My Life (1993), portraying spiritual healer Mr. Ho opposite Michael Keaton and Nicole Kidman. He was murdered in a robbery outside his home in Los Angeles in 1996.

Life under the Khmer Rouge
Haing Somnang Ngor was born in Samrong Young (in 1940, French Indochina), Bati district, now Takeo province, Cambodia, he trained as a surgeon and gynecologist. He was practicing in the capital, Phnom Penh, in 1975 when Pol Pot's Khmer Rouge seized control of the country and proclaimed it Democratic Kampuchea. He was compelled to conceal his education, medical skills, and even the fact that he wore glasses to avoid the new regime's intense hostility to intellectuals and professionals. He was expelled from Phnom Penh along with the bulk of its two million inhabitants as part of the Khmer Rouge's "Year Zero" social experiment and imprisoned in a concentration camp along with his wife, My-Huoy, who subsequently died giving birth, along with their unborn child. Although a gynecologist, he was unable to treat his wife, who required a Caesarean section, because he would have been exposed, and both he and his wife (as well as the child) would very probably have been killed. After the fall of the Khmer Rouge in 1979, Ngor worked as a doctor in a refugee camp in Thailand and left with his niece for the United States on August 30, 1980. In America, Ngor was unable to resume his medical practice, and he did not remarry.

In 1988, he wrote Haing Ngor: A Cambodian Odyssey, describing his life under the Khmer Rouge in Cambodia. In the second edition of Survival in the Killing Fields, Roger Warner, Ngor's co-author, adds an epilogue telling the story of Ngor's life after winning the Academy Award.

The Dr. Haing S. Ngor Foundation was founded in his honor in 1997 to assist in raising funds for Cambodian aid. As part of his humanitarian efforts, Ngor built an elementary school and operated a small sawmill that provided jobs and an income for local families. Ngor's niece, Sophia Ngor Demetri, who testified at the trial of his murderers and with whom he arrived in the U.S., is the current president of the Foundation.

Acting career
Ngor, despite having no previous acting experience, was cast as Dith Pran in The Killing Fields (1984), a role for which he won (among many honors) the Academy Award for Best Supporting Actor, becoming the first Asian to win Best Supporting Actor in debut performance, the second Asian actor to ever win an Oscar, and one of two amateur actors to win an Oscar following Harold Russell. Ngor was not initially interested in the role of Dith Pran, but interviews with the filmmakers changed his mind, as he recalled that he promised his late wife to tell Cambodia's story to the world. After appearing in The Killing Fields he told People magazine, "I wanted to show the world how deep starvation is in Cambodia, how many people die under communist regime. My heart is satisfied. I have done something perfect."

Ngor went on to appear in various other onscreen projects, most memorably in the Vanishing Son miniseries and Oliver Stone's Heaven & Earth (1993). He also appeared in the Hong Kong film Eastern Condors (1987), which was directed by and starred Sammo Hung.

Ngor appeared in a supporting role in the 1989 Vietnam War drama The Iron Triangle and guest-starred in a two-episode storyline on the acclaimed series China Beach (episodes "How to Stay Alive in Vietnam 1 & 2") as a wounded Cambodian POW who befriends Colleen McMurphy while under her care.  Ngor guest-starred in an episode of Miami Vice called "The Savage / Duty and Honor".

Next to The Killing Fields, Ngor's most prominent feature film role was in My Life (1993), the directorial debut of Academy Award-winning screenwriter Bruce Joel Rubin. Ngor portrayed a spiritual healer, Mr. Ho, who provides guidance for protagonist Bob Jones (Michael Keaton) and his wife Gail (Nicole Kidman) after Bob is diagnosed with terminal cancer, months before the birth of his and Gail's first child.

Foundation and legacy

The Dr. Haing S. Ngor Foundation was organized in 1990 by Ngor and Jack Ong. The two actors met in 1989 while filming "The Iron Triangle" and soon after, Pastor Ong's church (Venice Christian Community in Venice, California) launched Project Cambodia to raise funds to care for orphans and help rebuild the devastated country's infrastructure. Project Cambodia was the original foundation for The Dr. Haing S. Ngor Foundation, which was incorporated in 1997 after Ngor's homicide (February 25, 1996) as a 501 (C) (3) charitable organization. The goals of the Foundation include preserving the legacy of Ngor's accomplishments and human rights endeavors as well as the promotion of Cambodia's history and culture through education, activism and the arts. Ngor's niece, Sophia Ngor Demetri, who testified at the trial of his murderers and whom he brought to the U.S., is the current president of the foundation; Ong serves as executive director.

Death 

On February 25, 1996, Ngor was shot dead outside his home in Chinatown, in downtown Los Angeles, California. Many Cambodians claimed they had a stake in his estate, with one woman claiming he had married her after coming to the United States. Most of Ngor's Cambodian assets went to his younger brother, Chan Sarun, while his American assets were used up in legal fees staving off claims to his estate. He was buried at Rose Hills Memorial Park in Whittier, California.

Charged with the murder were three reputed members of the "Oriental Lazy Boyz" street gang, who had prior arrests for snatching purses and jewelry. They were tried together in the Superior Court of Los Angeles County, though their cases were heard by three separate juries. Prosecutors argued  they killed Ngor because, after handing over his gold Rolex watch willingly, he refused to give them a locket that contained a photo of his deceased wife, My-Huoy. Defense attorneys suggested the murder was a politically motivated killing carried out by sympathizers of the Khmer Rouge, but offered no evidence to support this theory. Kang Kek Iew, a former Khmer Rouge official on trial in Cambodia, claimed in November 2009 that Ngor was murdered on Pol Pot's orders, but U.S. investigators did not find him credible.

Some criticized the theory that Ngor was killed in a bungled robbery, pointing to $2,900 in cash that had been left behind and that the thieves had not rifled his pockets. Why the thieves would have demanded his locket has never been answered; Ngor typically wore the locket next to his skin under his clothing, so it would not have been easily visible. , the locket had not been recovered.

All of the defendants were found guilty on April 16, 1998, the same day Pol Pot's death was confirmed in Cambodia. Tak Sun Tan was sentenced to 56 years to life; Indra Lim to 26 years to life; and Jason Chan to life without parole. In 2004, the U.S. District Court for the Central District of California granted Tak Sun Tan's habeas corpus petition, finding that prosecutors had manipulated the jury's sympathy by presenting false evidence. This decision was reversed, and the conviction was ultimately upheld by the United States Court of Appeals for the Ninth Circuit in July 2005.

After the release of The Killing Fields, Ngor had told a New York Times reporter, "If I die from now on, OK! This film will go on for a hundred years."

Dith Pran, whom Ngor portrayed in The Killing Fields, said of Ngor's death, "He is like a twin with me. He is like a co-messenger and right now I am alone."

Filmography

Film

Television

References

Further reading
Ngor, Haing with Roger Warner. A Cambodian Odyssey. Macmillan Publishing Company, 1987. .
Ngor, Haing with Roger Warner. Survival in the Killing Fields. Carroll & Graf Publishers, 2003. .

External links

Haing Ngor Foundation website
Yahoo! Biography
CNN story on his death
Los Angeles Times article on his murder

1940 births
1996 deaths
1996 murders in the United States
American male film actors
American people of Chinese descent
BAFTA Most Promising Newcomer to Leading Film Roles winners
Best Actor BAFTA Award winners
Best Supporting Actor Academy Award winners
Best Supporting Actor Golden Globe (film) winners
Burials at Rose Hills Memorial Park
Cambodian male film actors
Cambodian emigrants to the United States
Cambodian genocide survivors
Cambodian people of Chinese descent
Deaths by firearm in California
Cambodian gynaecologists
People murdered in Los Angeles
20th-century American male actors
20th-century Cambodian male actors
20th-century American physicians
Hakka healthcare people